Hu Weide (1863 – 24 November 1933) was a Chinese politician and diplomat during the Qing dynasty and the Republic of China.

Biography
Though related by marriage to the Qing dynasty, he accepted the creation of the Republic and served in its foreign ministry, having previously been the Vice Minister of Foreign Affairs in the Qing Dynasty as a member of Yuan Shikai's Cabinet. He served as ambassador to Russia, Japan, and France; and was a rival of Wu Tingfang. He was also a judge of the Permanent Court of International Justice.

After Duan Qirui was ousted from Beijing in 1926, Hu served briefly as acting president and premier.

Hu Weide's political career is unique in that his career did not end with the passage of power from one form of government to another. He was a prominent politician and diplomat in the late Qing Dynasty as well as the early Republic of China. His role in the Chinese diplomacy history is immense, although he is also considered by many as being responsible for the feeble diplomacy practiced by China. Hu was truly one of the first Chinese politicians with a strong grasp of global affairs. He graduated from the Shanghai Interpreters' College. His proficiency in English, French and Russian allowed him to pursue the study of these countries, which made him a specialist in these nations.

Hu Weide's stature in the Chinese and international diplomatic sphere can be gauged from the fact that he was a member of the Chinese delegation at the Treaty of Versailles and at The Hague Peace Conference. Although he did not receive praise for his work to bring democracy in China, he played a vital role in persuading the late Qing Government to relinquish power in favor of the new Republic.

References

|-

|-

1863 births
1933 deaths
Presidents of the Republic of China
Premiers of the Republic of China
Ambassadors of the Republic of China
Permanent Court of International Justice judges
Politicians from Huzhou
Republic of China politicians from Zhejiang
20th-century Chinese heads of government
Ambassadors of China to France
Chinese judges of international courts and tribunals